Ashby Puerorum is a small village in the East Lindsey district of Lincolnshire, England. It is in the civil parish of Greetham with Somersby.

Bishop Oliver Sutton (1280–1299) was responsible for the renaming of this village, coining the name Ashby Puerorum or "the Little Boys' Ashby". This came about after the bishop assigned the revenues of the vicarage of Ashby to the upkeep of the boys in the cathedral choir.

Ashby Puerorum Grade II* listed Anglican church is dedicated to St Andrew. The church is chiefly Early English with Perpendicular windows and tower. There are brass effigies to Richard Lytleburye (d. 1521) and his wife Elizabeth (d. 1523).

References

External links

 
"Ashby Puerorum: Church History", Genuki.org.uk. Retrieved 9 July 2011
 

Villages in Lincolnshire
East Lindsey District